The Northland green gecko or Gray's tree gecko (Naultinus grayii ) is a species of gecko, a lizard in the family Gekkonidae. The species is found only in the Northland region of New Zealand, north of Whangaroa; it is one of the rarest and most highly sought after lizards.

Taxonomy
Naultinus grayii was originally described by Thomas Bell in 1843.

Etymology
The specific name, grayii, is in honor of British herpetologist John Edward Gray.

Description

The Northland green gecko is vivid green with grey or gold-coloured markings on either side along the dorsal surface.  Males have a blue band along the sides just below the limbs. Underneath, the ventral surface of both sexes is bright pale green, sometimes with a yellow tinge. The inside of the mouth is deep blue with a bright red tongue. 

Behaviour
The Northland green gecko is diurnal, often found sun-basking.  It has an arboreal lifestyle, especially favouring stands of manuka, kanuka, and mingimingi.

Conservation status
In 2012 the Department of Conservation classified the Northland green gecko as "At Risk" under the New Zealand Threat Classification System. It was judged as meeting the criteria for "At Risk" threat status as a result of it having a low to high ongoing or predicted decline. This gecko is also regarded as being "Data Poor".

Captivity 
This species, like all the Naultinus species, is regarded as the Holy grail of Geckos among their keepers, often going for a large amount of money for a pair of lizards. Outside of its home range, it is most commonly kept in Europe where there are several keepers producing offspring, though still extremely rarely seen.

In 2001 a German tourist was fined $12,000 for attempting to smuggle Northland green geckos out of the country in his underwear.

See also
Geckos of New Zealand

References

Further reading
Bell T (1843). The Zoology of the Voyage of H.M.S. Beagle Under the Command of Captain Fitzroy, R.N., during the years 1832 to 1836. Edited and Superintended by Charles Darwin ... Naturalist to the Expedition. Part 5., Reptiles. London: Smith, Elder and Company. vi + 51 pp. + Plates 1-20. (Naultinus grayii, new species, pp. 27–28 + Plate 13, figure 2). (in English and Latin).
Buller W (1871). "A List of the Lizards inhabiting New Zealand, with Descriptions". Transactions and Proceedings of the New Zealand Institute 3: 4–11. (Naultinus grayii, pp. 7–8).
Nielsen, Stuart V.; Bauer, Aaron M.; Jackman, Todd R.; Hitchmough, Rod A.; Daugherty, Charles H (2011). "New Zealand geckos (Diplodactylidae): Cryptic diversity in a post-Gondwanan lineage with trans-Tasman affinities". Molecular Phylogenetics and Evolution 59 (1): 1-22.

Naultinus
Reptiles of New Zealand
Reptiles described in 1843
Taxa named by Thomas Bell (zoologist)